Nationality words link to articles with information on the nation's poetry or literature (for instance, Irish or France).

Events

Works published

1491:
 Immanuel of Rome, Mahberot Imanu'el, published in Brescia, Italy, among the first books in Hebrew printed in Italy

1492:
 Savonarola, Apologeticus De Ratione Poeticae Artis, criticism; Italy
 Jorge Manrique, Coplas de Manrique por la muerte de su padre ("Couplets on the Death of His Father" or "Stanzas for the Death of His Father"), Spanish lyric poem

1493:
 Mir Ali Shir Nava'i, Mizan al-Awzan ("Scales of Poetic Meters"), Turkish poems

1494:
 John Lydgate, The Fall of Princes, 36,000-line poem translated c. 1431–1438 from the De casibus illustrium virorum of Boccaccio (see also Lydgate's Proverbs 1510), posthumously published
 Shin Maha Rahtathara, Bhuridat Zatpaung Pyo, Burmese poem
 Sebastian Brant, Das Narrenschiff ("The Ship of Fools"), much-translated satire, year of publication disputed, German

1495:
 Matteo Maria Boiardo, Orlando Innamorato ("Orlando in Love"), epic poem, Italy

1496:
 Juan del Encina, Cancionero, one-act Spanish verse drama and poetry
 Gyssaub Vaeze Kashefi, Aklake Mohseni ("Morals of the Beneficent"), prose and verse, Persian
 Shin Maha Rahtathara, Tada uti Mawgun, Burmese poetry collection

1497:
 John Lydgate, published anonymously, The Siege of Thebes, publication year uncertain, adapted c. 1421–1422 from an unknown French prose romance, posthumously published
 Jacob Locher, Das Narrenschiff, a translation, sometimes loose, into Latin from the original German of Das Narrenschiff ("The Ship of Fools") by Sebastian Brant
 Paul Riviere, a translation into French of Das Narrenschiff ("The Ship of Fools") by Sebastian Brant, from the original German

1498:
 Hinrek van Alkmaar, Reinke de Vos ("Reynard the Fox"), animal epic poem, Netherlands
 Mir Ali Shir Nava'i, Char Divan ("Four Divans"), lyric poems Chagatai Turkish

1499:
 John Skelton, published anonymously, The Bouge of Court, publication year uncertain, written in 1488; a satirical dream-allegory about court life
 Gilber Hay (or perhaps "Gilbert the Hay", who may have been a different person) publishes The Buik of King Alexander the Conquerour, part of The Buik of Alexander romance stories
 Pierre Gringore, Chasteau de Labour, printed by Antoine Vérard, France

Births

Death years link to the corresponding "[year] in poetry" article. There are conflicting or unreliable sources for the birth years of many people born in this period; where sources conflict, the poet is listed again and the conflict is noted:

1490:
 April – Vittoria Colonna (died 1547), Italian
 Girolamo Angeriano, also known as "Hieronymus Angerianus" born sometime between about 1470 and about 1490 (died 1535), Italian, Latin-language poet; sources differ on his birth year, with some stating 1470, others giving "c. 1480" and another c. 1490  
 Juan Boscan, original Catalan name: "Joan Boscà Almogàver", born about this year (died 1542), Catalan poet who wrote in Spanish
 Cristobal de Castillejo born about this year (died 1550), Spanish
 Sir David Lindsay (died c. 1555), Scottish
 Jean Salmon Macrin (died 1557), French, Latin-language poet
 Francesco Pittiani, born about this year (died 1552), Italian, Latin-language poet
 Giuseppe Sporeni, born about this year (died after 1562), Italian, Latin-language poet

1491:
 November 8 – Teofilo Folengo, (died 1544), Italian poet who wrote in Italian, Latin and a Macaronic style mixing the two
 Bach Van, also known as "Nguyen Bin Khiem", Vietnamese poet
 Latifî, also known as Kastamonulu Latifî Çelebi, Ottoman poet and bibliographer
 Mellin de Saint-Gelais (died  1558), French poet of the Renaissance and Poet Laureate of Francis I of France

1492:
 Pietro Aretino (died 1556), Italian poet and playwright
 Antoine Héroët, poète et clerc français, mort vers 1567.
 Marguerite de Navarre, also known as "Marguerite of Angoulême" and "Margaret of Navarre" (died 1549), French queen consort of King Henry II of Navarre; patron of humanists and reformers, author, playwright and poet

1493:
 September 28 – Agnolo Firenzuola (died c. 1545), Italian
 Anna Bijns (died 1575), Dutch
 Ján Silván (born 1573), Slovak
 Bernardo Tasso (died 1569), Italian

1494:
 November 5 – Hans Sachs (born 1576), German

1495:
 March 6 – Luigi Alamanni (died 1556), Italian poet and statesman
 Francisco Sa de Miranda (died 1558), Portuguese
 Fuzûlî, also known as "Mehmed ibn Suleyman", Turkish
 Suleiman the Magnificent born about this year (died 1566), Ottoman Empire sultan and poet

1496:
 November 23 – Clément Marot (died 1544), French
 Lazare de Baïf (died  1547), French poet, diplomat and humanist
 Lorenzo Gambara, born about this year (died 1586), Italian, Latin-language poet
 Richard Maitland (died 1586), Scottish
 Girolamo Muzio (died 1575), Italian, Latin-language poet
 Nawade I, Burmese
 Adam Reusner born sometime from 1471 to this year (died sometime from 1563 to 1582), German
 Johann Walter (died 1570), German poet and composer
 Lu Zhi (died 1576), Chinese landscape painter, calligrapher, and poet

1497:
 Francesco Berni born about this year, according to some sources, others say 1498 (died 1535), Italian writer and poet
 Philipp Melanchthon (died 1560), German professor, theologian and poet

1498:
 Francesco Berni born this year, according to some sources, others say he was born about 1497 (died 1535), Italian, Latin-language poet
 Huang O (died 1569), Chinese poet
 Marcantonio Flaminio (died 1550), Italian, Latin-language poet
 Meerabai मीराबाई  (died  1547), alternate spelling: Meera, Mira, Meera Bai; Indian, Hindu poet-saint, mystical poet whose compositions, extant version of which are in Gujarati and a Rajasthani dialect of Hindi, remain popular throughout India

1499:
 Sebastian Franck, who called himself "Franck von Word" (died 1542 or 1543), German freethinker, humanist, radical reformer and poet

Deaths

Birth years link to the corresponding "[year] in poetry" article:

1490:
 Giovanni Michele Alberto Carrara (born 1438), Italian, Latin-language poet
 Alessandro Cortesi (born 1460), Italian, Latin-language poet
 Dafydd Gorlech (born 1410), Welsh language poet
 Gómez Manrique (born 1412), Spanish poet, soldier, politician and dramatist
 Sean mac Fergail Óicc Ó hÚigínn, Irish poet and Ollamh Érenn
 Francesco Rolandello (born 1427), Italian, Latin-language poet
 Martino Filetico (born 1430), Italian, Latin-language poet

1491:
 Jean Meschinot (born 1420), French

1492:
 November 6 – Antoine Busnois (born c. 1430), French composer and poet
 Blind Harry, also known as "Henry the Minstrel", (born c. 1440), Scottish makar (poet)
 Jami (born 1414), Persian scholar, mystic, writer, composer of numerous lyrics and idylls, historian, and Sufi poet
 Alfonso de Palencia (born 1423), Castilian pre-Renaissance historian, writer, and poet
 Lorenzo de' Medici (born 1440), Italian banker, politician, patron of the arts and poet who wrote in his native Tuscan

1493:
 Ermolao Barbaro, sources differ on his death year, with some simply stating this year and others stating this year and 1495 are each possible, born 1453), Italian, Latin-language poet
 Guto'r Glyn, approximate date (born c.1412), Welsh language poet

1494:
 November 17 – Giovanni Pico della Mirandola (born 1463), Renaissance humanist and Italian, Latin-language poet
 December 20 – Matteo Maria Boiardo (born c. 1434), Italian poet
 Galeotto Marzio, died this year or 1497 (born 1427 or 1428), Italian, Latin-language poet
 Angelo Poliziano, (born 1454), Italian, Latin-language poet

1495:
 Ermolao Barbaro, sources differ in his death year, with some simply giving 1493 and others stating that either that year or this year is possible (born 1453), Italian, Latin-language poet
 C. Aurelio Cambini died sometime after 1494 (born c. 1463), Italian, Latin-language poet

1496:
 Callimaco Esperiente (born 1437), Italian, Latin-language poet

1497:
 Galeotto Marzio died this year or 1494 (born 1427/1428), Italian, Latin-language poet

1498:

 Rodrigo Cota de Maguaque (born unknown), Spanish poet
 Diego de San Pedro (born 1437), Castilian writer and poet
 Cristoforo Landino (born 1424), Italian, Latin-language poet
 Conor Carragh Ó Curnín (born unknown), Irish poet

1499:
 Quinto Emiliano Cimbriaco died about this year (born 1449), Italian, Latin-language poet
 Probo de Marianis (born 1455), Italian, Latin-language poet
 Jeronim Vidulić (birth year unknown), Croatian Renaissance poet

See also

 Poetry
 15th century in poetry
 15th century in literature
 List of years in poetry
 Grands Rhétoriqueurs
 French Renaissance literature
 Renaissance literature
 Spanish Renaissance literature

Other events:
 Other events of the 15th century
 Other events of the 16th century

16th century:
 16th century in poetry
 16th century in literature

Notes

15th-century poetry
Poetry